Daniel Leone (3 June 1993 – 3 October 2021) was an Italian professional footballer who played as a goalkeeper.

Career
Leone played for Reggina, Pontedera, Reggiana, Torres, Latina and Catanzaro. Two of the clubs were in Serie B, but he never played higher than Serie C. He retired in 2017 after being diagnosed with a tumour in 2014. He died in October 2021 aged 28.

References

1993 births
2021 deaths
Italian footballers
Association football goalkeepers
Reggina 1914 players
U.S. Città di Pontedera players
A.C. Reggiana 1919 players
S.E.F. Torres 1903 players
Latina Calcio 1932 players
U.S. Catanzaro 1929 players
Serie C players
Lega Pro Seconda Divisione players
Deaths from brain cancer in Italy